Mathias Niederberger is a German professional ice hockey goaltender who currently plays for Red Bull Munich of the Deutsche Eishockey Liga (DEL). His father, Andreas Niederberger, is a member of the German ice hockey Hall of Fame.

Playing career
Coming through the youth ranks of Düsseldorfer EG, he made his debut in Germany's top flight Deutsche Eishockey Liga (DEL) during the 2010–11 season. He joined EHC München of the DEL after two seasons of major junior hockey with the Barrie Colts of the Ontario Hockey League (OHL). With NHL aspirations, Niederberger was later granted a release from his contract with EHC to sign a one-year American Hockey League contract with the Manchester Monarchs on 19 July 2013.

In his only North American season in 2013–14, Niederberger struggled to adapt and was also hampered by injuries, appearing in 6 games with the Monarchs. At the season's end, he opted to return to Germany's top division, signing a multi-year contract to compete for a starting position with Eisbären Berlin on 5 June 2014. After spending the 2014–15 season with the Eisbären squad, seeing the ice in 12 DEL contests, Niederberger went back to Düsseldorfer EG on loan. He received 2015–16 DEL Goaltender of the Year honors.

Following his fifth consecutive season with Düsseldorfer in 2019–20, Niederberger left the club at the conclusion of his contract, agreeing to join former loan club, Eisbären Berlin on an optional multi-year contract on 19 March 2020.

International play 
In April 2016, he made his debut for the German national team.  He also represented Germany at the 2018 IIHF World Championship.

Career statistics

International

Awards and honors

References

External links

1992 births
Living people
Barrie Colts players
DEG Metro Stars players
Düsseldorfer EG players
Eisbären Berlin players
Manchester Monarchs (AHL) players
Ontario Reign (ECHL) players
Sportspeople from Düsseldorf
German ice hockey goaltenders
Ice hockey players at the 2022 Winter Olympics
Olympic ice hockey players of Germany